Second Row may refer to:

 Second Row (rugby union), a name for the two lock positions in rugby union
 Second Row (rugby league), a name for the two  forward positions in rugby league